Asmeret Ghebremichael is an American actress and singer, known for her work in Submissions Only, Legally Blonde, and The Book of Mormon.

Early life and education
Ghebremichael grew up in Churchill, Pennsylvania, with her parents and younger sister. As a child, she trained in dance and musical theatre at the Abby Lee Dance Company and was taught by Abby Lee Miller. Ghebremichael attended Woodland Hills High School and earned a B.S. in communications from New York University.

Career
Ghebremichael made her Broadway debut in 1999, playing Rusty, Wendy Jo, Urleen, and the Ensemble (varying) in Footloose. She later appeared in the ensembles of Wicked and Spamalot (she also played the minstrel) on Broadway, as well as Lone Star Love and In the Heights (for which she won a Drama Desk Award) off-Broadway. In 2007, she played Pilar in Legally Blonde on Broadway. The show was filmed for TV, and in 2008 she began also understudying the roles of Shandi and Brooke Wyndham. She also appeared on the reality competition show Legally Blonde: The Musical – The Search for Elle Woods twice. The show closed in 2008, and after appearing in the film Confessions of a Shopaholic, Ghebremichael began playing Raina Pearl in the web series Submissions Only. She also played Shawanda in the original Broadway cast of Elf: The Musical, and in 2011 she appeared in the ensemble of The Book of Mormon on Broadway. She later played Nabulungi in the show, and is currently playing the role in the West End production, which she started in February 2016. In 2015, she appeared as a munchkin in The Wiz Live! on NBC. In 2017 she joined the West End cast of Dreamgirls as Lorrell Robinson.

Theatre credits

Television

Film

Discography

Awards and nominations

References

External links
 
 
 Asmeret Ghebremichael at Internet Off-Broadway Database

Living people
Place of birth missing (living people)
Year of birth missing (living people)
American women singers
American people of Eritrean descent
American web series actresses
20th-century American actresses
21st-century American actresses